Li Jiheng (born January 1957) is a Chinese politician, who former served as Minister of Civil Affairs. He also is the former Communist Party Secretary of Inner Mongolia, the former Communist Party Chief and Governor of Yunnan province and a former Deputy Party Chief of Guangxi Zhuang Autonomous Region.

Career

Guangxi
Li Jiheng is a native of Guigang, Guangxi Zhuang Autonomous Region. He joined the Chinese Communist Party in October 1976, at the age of 19.  From November 1976 to August 1979 Li studied at the Department of Chinese of Guangxi University.

From 1985 to 1991 Li Jiheng served as Deputy Communist Party Chief of Gui County (now Guigang City), and Party Chief of Pingnan County and Guiping County, all in Guangxi.  He was promoted to Deputy Party Chief of Hechi prefecture in 1991, and Party Chief in 1995.  In 1996 he was transferred to nearby Yulin prefecture to become its Communist Party Chief.

From 1999 to 2003 Li was a part-time student at the Graduate School of the Chinese Academy of Social Sciences, where he studied Administration of Agricultural Economy and obtained a doctoral degree.

In 2001 Li Jiheng became the Party Chief of Nanning, the capital of Guangxi, and in March 2005 he was promoted to Deputy Party Chief of Guangxi Zhuang Autonomous Region.

Yunnan
In July 2006 Li Jiheng was transferred to the neighbouring province of Yunnan to become its Deputy Party Secretary. In August 2011 he was appointed Acting Governor of Yunnan, succeeding Qin Guangrong, who was promoted to Communist Party Chief of the province.  In February 2012 Li was elected Governor by the Yunnan Provincial Congress. In October 2014, Li was appointed Party Chief of Yunnan, replacing Qin Guangrong.

Li was an alternate member of the 15th, 16th, and 17th Central Committees of the Chinese Communist Party.  He is a full member of the 18th Central Committee.

Inner Mongolia 
In August 2016, Li Jiheng was appointed as the Communist Party Secretary of Inner Mongolia by the CCP Central Committee.

Ministry of Civil Affairs 
On October 26, 2019, Li Jiheng was appointed as the Minister of Civil Affairs by the Standing Committee of the National People's Congress.

National People's Congress 
On February 28, 2022, he became vice chairperson of the National People's Congress Agriculture and Rural Affairs Committee.

References 

Living people
1957 births
Governors of Yunnan
Chinese Communist Party politicians from Guangxi
People's Republic of China politicians from Guangxi
People from Guigang
Political office-holders in Inner Mongolia
Political office-holders in Guangxi
Members of the 18th Central Committee of the Chinese Communist Party
Guangxi University alumni